npj Digital Medicine is a peer-reviewed open-access medical journal covering all aspects of digital medicine. The journal was established in 2018 and is published by Nature Portfolio. The editor-in-chief is Joseph C. Kvedar (Harvard Medical School). The journal publishes research articles, brief communications, comments, editorials, and reviews.

Abstracting and indexing
The journal is abstracted and indexed in:
CINAHL
 Current Contents/Clinical Medicine
Embase
Inspec
 Science Citation Index Expanded
Scopus
According to the Journal Citation Reports, the journal has a 2021 impact factor of 15.357.

References

External links

English-language journals
Springer Science+Business Media academic journals
Nature Research academic journals
Creative Commons Attribution-licensed journals
Publications established in 2018
Continuous journals